Conshohocken station is a station located along the SEPTA Manayunk/Norristown Line. The station, located below Fayette Street, at Washington and Harry Streets in Conshohocken, Pennsylvania, includes a 95-space parking lot.  In FY 2013, Conshohocken station had a weekday average of 646 boardings and 682 alightings.

Trains run with relative infrequency from this station given the actual and potential ridership, 30 to 40 minutes apart in rush hour and 1 hour or longer apart off-peak.  Center City Philadelphia is about a 40-minute travel time away by regional rail from here, though it is only 15 miles away.

Station layout
The station building, which is currently a trailer, is only open weekdays during the morning and early afternoon. Tickets can be purchased at the station during these times only. SEPTA's station should not be confused with the station building on the abandoned Pennsylvania Railroad Schuylkill Branch, which is now the Schuylkill River Trail. This building, located a short distance away up Harry Street, is now a privately owned café and does not sell tickets.

References

External links
SEPTA – Conshohocken Station
 Station from Fayette Street from Google Maps Street View
 Old Reading Depot image (Existing Railroad Stations in Montgomery County, Pennsylvania)

SEPTA Regional Rail stations
Former Reading Company stations
Railway stations in Montgomery County, Pennsylvania